Andrew Fahy is an Irish hurler who plays as a goalkeeper for the Clare senior team and plays club hurling for Whitegate.

On 4 June 2017, Fahy started his first Championship game as Clare defeated Limerick in the Munster Senior Hurling Championship semi-final at Semple Stadium on a 2-16 to 3-17 scoreline.

Honours

Clare
All-Ireland Intermediate Hurling Championship (1): 2011
Munster Intermediate Hurling Championship (1): 2011

References

Living people
Whitegate hurlers
Clare inter-county hurlers
Year of birth missing (living people)